We Mapped the World is an extended play by musician, Joy Williams. It was released on April 5, 2010.

Track listing

References

2010 EPs
Joy Williams (singer) albums